The Old Lutz Elementary School (also known as the Old Lutz Schoolhouse) is a historic school in Lutz, Florida. It is located at 18819 U.S. 41, North. On August 15, 1996, it was added to the U.S. National Register of Historic Places.

References

External links
 Hillsborough County listings at National Register of Historic Places
 Florida's Office of Cultural and Historical Programs
 Hillsborough County listings

Public elementary schools in Florida
National Register of Historic Places in Hillsborough County, Florida
Colonial Revival architecture in Florida